Manikpur is an Indian place name, and may refer to:
 
 Manikpur, Assam, a town, a block, and a subdivision in Bongaigaon district
 Manikpur, Muzaffarpur, also known as Manikpur estate, a village in Muzaffarpur district, Bihar
 Manikpur, Chitrakoot, a town and a nagar panchayat and tehsil in Chitrakoot district, Uttar Pradesh
 Manikpur Assembly constituency, a constituency of the Uttar Pradesh Legislative Assembly covering the city of Manikpur in Chitrakoot district
 Manikpur, Pratapgarh, a town and a nagar panchayat in Pratapgarh district, Uttar Pradesh
 Manikpur, West Bengal, a town in Howrah district
 Kara-Manikpur, a subah (province) in medieval India